Dolac is a farmers' market located in Gornji Grad - Medveščak city district of Zagreb, Croatia. Dolac is the most visited and the best known farmer's market in Zagreb, well known for its combination of traditional open market with stalls and a sheltered market below. It is located only a few dozen meters away from the main city square, Ban Jelačić Square, between the oldest parts of Zagreb, Gradec and Kaptol. The Dolac market Zagreb is centrally located right behind the town’s main square.

The daily market, on a raised square a set of stairs up from Jelačić, has been the city’s major trading place since 1930. Farmers from surrounding villages come to sell their home-made foodstuffs and very fresh fruit and vegetables. In the covered market downstairs are butchers, fishmongers and old ladies selling the local speciality sir i vrhnje (cheese and cream). Flowers and lace are also widely available. Alongside, the renovated fish market, ribarnica, sells fresh produce every day but Monday.

References

Sources
 Dolački vremeplov 
 Karlo Vajda i Vjekoslav Bastl: Izgradnja tržnice na Dolcu u Zagrebu, 1928.-1936.

External links 

Tržnica Dolac 
DOLAC: Najveća, najpoznatija i najvažnija tržnica u Zagrebu 

Gornji Grad–Medveščak
Culture in Zagreb
Food markets
Farmers' markets
Agricultural organizations based in Croatia